Historically, the harbor was the key to the Hampton Roads area's growth, both on land and in water-related activities and events. Ironically, the harbor and its tributary waterways were (and still are) both important transportation conduits and obstacles to other land-based commerce and travel. For hundreds of years, state and community leaders have worked to develop solutions to accommodate both.

Many early bridges were constructed and funded privately through the collection of tolls. Later, state-sponsorship was required to fund larger projects. The best example of many was in 1957, when the world's first continuous bridge-tunnel complex was successfully completed across the mouth of the Hampton Roads harbor, innovatively designed and funded with toll revenue bonds. Soon, another even larger one was built across the entire mouth of the Chesapeake Bay, exceeding many expectations.

In modern times, the region has faced increasing transportation challenges as it has become largely urbanized, with additional traffic needs. In the 21st century, the conflicts between traffic on vital waterways and land-based travel continue to present the area's leaders with extraordinary transportation challenges, both for additional capacity, and as the existing infrastructure, much of it originally built with toll revenues, has aged without an adequate source of funding to repair or build replacements. The now-closed Kings Highway Bridge in Suffolk and the Jordan Bridge in neighboring Chesapeake, each built in the 1920s, are considered locally prime examples of this situation.

Public opinion polls seem to indicate that many citizens feel the accomplishments with the historic bridge-tunnels across the harbor and nearby Chesapeake Bay and the many other improvements since, such as the completion of the Hampton Roads Beltway and a third bridge-tunnel (second across the harbor) in 1992 are indicative that the region's leaders will be capable of seeking and employing new transportation and funding solutions for the future, and that they will receive the necessary public support to do so.

In 2007, the new Hampton Roads Transportation Authority (HRTA) was formed under a controversial state law to levy various additional taxes to generate funding for major regional transportation projects, including a long-sought and costly so-called third crossing of the harbor of Hampton Roads. As of March 2008, although its projects were considered to be needed, the agency's future was in some question while its controversial sources of funding were being reconsidered in light of a Virginia Supreme Court decision. In the time since, a shift to facilities to be developed and maintained by public-private partnerships collecting tolls has come into greater focus. One such project, a replacement for the Jordan Bridge, is already under construction.

Highways, bridges, tunnels, bridge-tunnels, ferry system

The Hampton Roads area has an extensive network of Interstate Highways, including the Interstate 64, the major east-west route to and from the area, and its spurs and bypasses of I-264, I-464, I-564, and I-664.

Long-term plans being pushed by the Raleigh-Durham area's Regional Transportation Alliance call for extension of I-495 northeastward to the Hampton Roads area.  RTA's plan envisions the entirety of the corridor from Raleigh to Norfolk receiving a new two-digit interstate designation such as I-44.  This interstate would connect two of the United States' largest metropolitan areas still lacking direct interstate access between each other.

The Hampton Roads Beltway extends  on a long loop through the region, crossing the harbor on two toll-free bridge-tunnel facilities. These crossings are the Hampton Roads Bridge-Tunnel between Phoebus in Hampton and Willoughby Spit in Norfolk and the Monitor-Merrimac Memorial Bridge-Tunnel between Newport News and Suffolk.
The Beltway connects with another Interstate highway and three arterial U.S. Highways at Bower's Hill near the northeastern edge of the Great Dismal Swamp.

Other major east-west routes are U.S. Route 58, U.S. Route 60, and U.S. Route 460. The major north-south routes are U.S. Route 13 and U.S. Route 17.

Another major crossing of waterways is the James River Bridge, carrying US 17, US 258, and SR 32 from Newport News to Isle of Wight County.

There are also two other tunnels in the area, the Midtown Tunnel, and the Downtown Tunnel joining Portsmouth and Norfolk, as well as the -long Chesapeake Bay Bridge-Tunnel, a toll facility which links the region with Virginia's Eastern Shore which carries US 13. The original Downtown Tunnel in conjunction with the Berkley Bridge were considered a single bridge and tunnel complex when completed in 1952, perhaps stimulating the innovative bridge-tunnel design using man-made islands when the Hampton Roads Bridge-Tunnel was planned, first opening in 1957.

The George P. Coleman Memorial Bridge is a major toll bridge connecting U.S. Highway 17 on the Peninsula at Yorktown with Virginia's Middle Peninsula region.

Although earlier ferry services across the Bay, the harbor, and various rivers were eventually supplanted in the 20th century by bridges, tunnels, and bridge-tunnels, a passenger ferry continues to operate between Norfolk and Portsmouth, and one major automobile ferry service also remains. The Jamestown Ferry (also known as the Jamestown-Scotland Ferry) is an automobile ferry system on the James River connecting Jamestown in James City County with Scotland in Surry County. It carries State Route 31. Operated by VDOT, it is the only 24-hour state-run ferry operation in Virginia and has over 90 employees. It operates four ferryboats, the Pocahontas, the Williamsburg, the Surry, and the Virginia. The facility is toll-free.

Local public transportation

Local public transit is provided by a bus network operated by the Hampton Roads Transit (HRT) and Williamsburg Area Transit Authority (WATA), both of which are operations of government agencies. HRT's The Tide light rail system has completed construction and opened in early 2011.

In Virginia, the region is notable in that it has 2 types of public transport services via ferrys. A passenger ferry is operated on the Elizabeth River between downtown areas of Norfolk and Portsmouth by HRT. A commuter bus route across the James River between Williamsburg and rural Surry County is provided via the vehicle-carrying Jamestown Ferry system.

Hampton Roads Transit

A regional transit bus system, paratransit service, and the Tide light rail system are provided by Hampton Roads Transit (HRT), a regional public transport system headquartered in Hampton. The HRT service area include the major population centers of Hampton Roads which are linked to each other by the Hampton Roads Beltway. Commuter service is provided through both major bridge-tunnels across the harbor helps reduce congestion in many other high traffic corridors. Many areas in adjoining communities are also served.

As the largest transit operator, Hampton Roads Transit is southeastern Virginia's most reliable mobility source, serving over 17 million annual passengers in the Hampton Roads metropolitan area. HRT currently serves 1.2 million people within its  service area.

Williamsburg Area Transit Authority

 
In the upper (western) Peninsula area known as the Historic Triangle, a transit bus system and paratransit services are provided by Williamsburg Area Transit Authority (WATA), based in the Williamsburg area, which serves Williamsburg, James City County, and a portion of York County. The system offers a connection with the much larger Hampton Roads Transit system at Lee Hall, Virginia and at the Williamsburg Transportation Center.

The Williamsburg Transportation Center is located in a restored building which was formerly a Chesapeake and Ohio Railway station. Along the railroad line built to connect the Ohio River Valley with the new city of Newport News and the port of Hampton Roads by Collis P. Huntington in 1881, the station was originally built in 1935 with funding from John D. Rockefeller Jr. as part of the restoration of the colonial capital which became known worldwide as Colonial Williamsburg. During the heyday of the railroads, dozens of dignitaries arrived there, including Presidents Franklin D. Roosevelt, Harry S. Truman and Dwight D. Eisenhower and Winston Churchill. In modern times, the center offers good non-automobile driving alternatives for visitors and citizens, both getting there, and moving around locally, with rail service, intercity and local transit bus services.

Light rail, bus rapid transit, maglev projects
A light rail service known as The Tide was opened in Norfolk on August 19, 2011 and extends 7.4 miles from the Eastern Virginia Medical Center complex east through downtown Norfolk and adjacent to I-264 to Newtown Road. Operated by Hampton Roads Transit, it is the first major light rail service in the state. As of April 17, 2012, the daily ridership was estimated to be 4,900.

The Virginia Beach Transit Extension Study is examining the best transit options for possibly extending The Tide or adding bus rapid transit from Newtown Road to the Virginia Beach Oceanfront.

There has also been a light rail study in the Hampton - Newport News areas.

There is a small very experimental Magnetic levitation project under development on campus at Old Dominion University in Norfolk. Using a new experimental technology, it was not yet operational as of 2011.

Intercity bus
Intercity bus service is provided by Greyhound Lines and Carolina Trailways.

Passenger rail
The area is served by passenger rail service provided by Amtrak, with stations in Williamsburg, Newport News, and Norfolk, and connecting bus service to Virginia Beach.

The Virginia Department of Rail and Public Transportation has studies underway for extending high speed passenger rail to the Virginia Peninsula and South Hampton Roads areas with a rail connection at Richmond to the Southeast High Speed Rail Corridor.

Air
The Hampton Roads is served by two major commercial airports: Norfolk International Airport and the smaller Newport News/Williamsburg International Airport.

Norfolk International Airport
Norfolk International Airport (ORF) is the main air passenger and cargo transport hub in the region. Offering nearly 160 arrivals and departures daily to major cities throughout the US, Norfolk International presently ranks in the country's top 65 airports in terms of passengers served annually, with an average of 3.5 million. The airport is served by five airlines, with flights to 25 nonstop destinations:

Allegiant Air - Nonstop flights to Fort Lauderdale, Jacksonville (seasonal service), Orlando/Sanford, and St. Petersburg/Clearwater
American Airlines - Nonstop flights to Charlotte and Dallas-Fort Worth
American Eagle - Nonstop flights to Charlotte, Chicago- O'Hare, Miami, New York-JFK, New York-LaGuardia, Philadelphia, and Washington-Reagan
Delta Air Lines - Nonstop flights to Atlanta
Delta Connection - Nonstop flights to Boston, Detroit, Minneapolis-St.Paul, New York-JFK, and New York-LaGuardia
Frontier Airlines - Nonstop flights to Denver (seasonal service), Las Vegas, and Orlando (seasonal service)
Southwest Airlines - Nonstop flights to Baltimore-Washington, Chicago-Midway, Denver (seasonal service), and Orlando
United Airlines - Nonstop flights to Chicago-O'Hare (seasonal service), Denver, and Washington-Dulles (seasonal service)
United Express - Nonstop flights to Chicago-O'Hare, Houston-Intercontinental, Newark, and Washington-Dulles

Newport News/Williamsburg International Airport
Newport News/Williamsburg International Airport (PHF) (formerly known as Patrick Henry Field) is a regional air passenger transport hub in southeastern Virginia. The airport, which is among the fastest growing airports in the country (by passenger volume), serves an average of 1.5 million annual passengers, and is served by four (4) airlines, with flights to twelve nonstop destinations. It is the hub for up-start low-cost carrier People Express Airlines, which takes its name from the famous 1970s airline of the same name. Destinations served include:

American Eagle - Charlotte and Philadelphia
Delta Air Lines - Atlanta
Delta Connection - Atlanta

See also
Hampton Roads Transportation Accountability Commission
Transportation of Virginia Beach
Transportation of Norfolk
Transportation in Williamsburg

References

External links
Hampton Roads Transportation Planning Organization
Hampton Roads Transportation Accountability Commission

 
Transportation in Virginia